Tan Kok Yew is a Malaysian politician who served as Kedah State Executive Councillor.

Election results

References 

Living people
People from Kedah
Malaysian people of Chinese descent
Democratic Action Party (Malaysia) politicians
21st-century Malaysian politicians
Members of the Kedah State Legislative Assembly
Kedah state executive councillors
1967 births